Robert Davis may refer to:

Arts and entertainment
 DJ Screw (1971–2000), rap DJ and inventor of "Screwed" music
 Robert Davis, the real name of comedian Jasper Carrott
 Robert Hobart Davis (1869–1942), American dramatist, journalist, and photographer
 Robert P. Davis (1929–2005), American author and screenwriter
 Robert Tyler Davis (1904–1978), American art historian

Law
 Robert E. Davis (judge) (1939–2010), Kansas Supreme Court Justice
 Robert Grimes Davis (1819–1872), Kingdom of Hawaii Supreme Court Justice
 Robert N. Davis (born 1953), judge of the United States Court of Appeals for Veterans Claims

Military
 Robert Davis (RAF officer) (born 1930), British air marshal
 Robert Courtney Davis (1876–1944), officer in the United States Army

Politics
 Robert Atkinson Davis (1841–1903), Premier of Manitoba, 1874–1878
 Robert Lee Davis (1893–1967), U.S. Representative from the state of Pennsylvania
 Robert O. Davis (1910–1992), Pennsylvania politician
 Robert T. Davis (1823–1906), U.S. Representative from the state of Massachusetts
 Robert William Davis (1932–2009), U.S. Representative from the state of Michigan
 Robert Wyche Davis (1849–1929), U.S. Representative from the state of Florida
 Robert Davis (British politician) (born 1957), British Conservative Party politician

Science and technology
 Robert Davis (inventor) (1870–1965), inventor in 1910 of a new model of oxygen rebreather, used to escape from submarines
 Robert E. Davis (climatologist), associate professor of climatology at the University of Virginia
 Robert B. Davis (1926–1997), American mathematician

Others
 Butch Davis (outfielder, born 1916) (Robert Lomax Davis, 1916–1988), American baseball player
 Robert Davis (New Orleans) (born 1941), who was beaten by three police officers in New Orleans shortly after Hurricane Katrina
 Robert R. Davis (born 1949), American economist and Commodity Futures Trading Commission commissioner
 Robert L. Davis (police chief) (born 1958), Chief in the San Jose Police Department
 Robert Davis (wide receiver) (born 1995), American football wide receiver

See also
 Rob Davis (disambiguation)
 Bob Davis (disambiguation)
 Bert Davis (disambiguation)
 Robert Hartford-Davis (1923–1977), British born producer, director and writer
 Glenn Robert Davis (1914–1988), U.S. Representative from the state of Wisconsin
 Robert Davies (disambiguation)